Alicia Llanos de Ramos is the wife of Jorge Ramos Hernández, the current Municipal president of Tijuana.

She holds the honorary title of First Lady of Tijuana, and officially serves as President of the Municipal DIF Sponsorship.

References

First ladies of Tijuana
People from Tijuana
Living people
Politicians from Baja California
Year of birth missing (living people)